The 2015 NRL season was the 108th season of professional rugby league in Australia and the 18th season of the National Rugby League in Australia and New Zealand. The season started in New Zealand with the annual Auckland Nines, which was followed by the Rugby League All Stars Match, returning after a one-year hiatus, and the World Club Series. North Queensland Cowboys won their first premiership in only the second Grand Final to be decided in extra time and their second ever grand final.

Season launch and advertising
The season launched with a gala event at the Queens Wharf, Auckland on 29 January attended by a selection of the code's stars including Shaun Johnson and Greg Inglis. It was the first time the event had been held outside Australia.

The NRL and their longstanding ad agency MJW Haukuhodo used, for the second year running, Robbie Williams' "Let Me Entertain You" as the commercial soundtrack. The launch commercial takes members and supporters on a journey from the outback plains of Western Queensland to an inner city boot camp in Sydney and features more than fifty NRL club members and fans in a range of scenarios that include a rendition of a Haka on a Sydney train and a focus on  Greg Inglis' trademark Goanna post-try celebration.

The second Sunday afternoon match began at 4:10pm instead of the traditional 3:10pm. This change was to allow the Nine Network to show the match live into New South Wales and Queensland, and use it as a lead-in to their respective 6:00 pm news bulletins.

Teams

The lineup of teams remained unchanged for the 9th consecutive year. The NRL's salary cap for the clubs' top 25 players will be $A6.3M for 2015.

Pre-season

The 2015 pre-season featured the second Auckland Nines tournament, held over a weekend at Auckland's Eden Park in which the South Sydney Rabbitohs defeated the Cronulla-Sutherland Sharks in the final. This tournament took place on the last weekend of January, and the All Stars match was played on Friday 13 February at Cbus Super Stadium in Robina. The 2015 World Club Series took place in England with 2014 premiers the South Sydney Rabbitohs taking on Super League champions St. Helens in the showpiece match, which South Sydney won.

Regular season

Bold – Opposition's Home game
X – Bye
Opponent for round listed above margin

Ladder

Ladder progression
Numbers highlighted in green indicate that the team finished the round inside the top 8.
Numbers highlighted in blue indicates the team finished first on the ladder in that round.
Numbers highlighted in red indicates the team finished last place on the ladder in that round.
Underlined numbers indicate that the team had a bye during that round.

Finals series

A new record was set for overall attendance in Week 1 of the Finals with a combined total of 131,794.

† Match decided in golden point extra time.

Chart

Grand final

Regular season player statistics
The following statistics are of the conclusion of Round 26.

Top 5 point scorers

Top 5 try scorers

Top 5 goal scorers

Top 5 tacklers

2015 Transfers

Players

Coaches

References